John Gilbert Cook CVO CBE (16 May 1911 in Bedfordshire, England –  in Norfolk, England) was an English cricketer, and English rugby union player. Educated at Bedford School, he played twice for the Irish cricket team, making his debut against the Marylebone Cricket Club (MCC) at Lord's in August 1935, and playing his one and only first-class match against India the following year. In 1937, he played his only rugby union international, representing England in the Four Nations against Scotland, playing as a flanker and scoring no points.

See also
 List of Irish cricket and rugby union players

References 

1911 births
1979 deaths
Bedfordshire cricketers
Commanders of the Order of the British Empire
Commanders of the Royal Victorian Order
England international rugby union players
English cricketers
English rugby union players
Ireland cricketers
People educated at Bedford School
Rugby union players from Bedfordshire